Hugo Herrera (born March 1, 1979 in Buenos Aires, Argentina) is an Argentine former association football forward who had stints in South America, and most notably in the Canadian Soccer League with the Brampton Stallions and Toronto Croatia. During his tenure within the CSL he won three CSL Championships and two Croatian World Club Championship.

Playing career 
Herrera began his career in his native Argentina with Defensa y Justicia in the Primera B Nacional in 2000, where he would appear in a total of 10 matches and two goals recorded. In 2003, he went abroad to Chile to play with Provincial Osorno of the Primera B de Chile. In 2003, he signed a contract with Canadian side Brampton Hitmen of the Canadian Professional Soccer League. He made his debut match for the franchise on July 20, 2003 against Toronto Croatia, where he contributed with a goal which resulted in a 5-0 victory for Brampton. He had a great debut season in the CPSL recording six goals in eight matches, and clinching a postseason berth for club by finishing second in the Western Conference.

In the postseason he featured in the quarterfinal match against Toronto Croatia, which resulted in a victory for Toronto, but was later overruled due to Toronto Croatia fielding an illegal player. In the following playoff match he scored the lone goal for Brampton in a 1-1 draw with London City, the game went to penalties and Herrera successfully converted his penalty kick, and the Hitmen advanced to the finals in a 5-3 victory in penalties. In the finals Brampton faced Vaughan Sun Devils, and the match concluded in a 1-0 victory for the club, marking the organizations first CPSL Championship. After a four-year tenure with the Brampton franchise, Herrera signed with league giants Toronto Croatia for the 2007 season. He would record his first goal for Toronto on June 1, 2007 in a match against London City in a 1-1 draw. That same season Toronto Croatia entered the Croatian World Club Championship, where Herrera contributed a goal in a 9-1 victory over Croatia Essen. Croatia would end up winning the tournament in a 3-1 victory over Canberra FC.

For the remainder of the season he helped Toronto achieve a 21-game undefeated streak, and reached the postseason by finishing second in the International Division. In the playoffs Toronto reached the finals where they faced arch rivals the Serbian White Eagles FC in a two-game final, where Croatia would end up claiming the CSL Championship in a 4-1 victory in goals on aggregate. His next best season with Toronto was in 2011, where once more the team repeated their success on the international level claiming their second Croatian World Club Championship and dominated at the domestic level by defeating Capital City F.C. in the finals of the CSL Championship match by a score of 1-0.

Honors
Brampton Hitmen 
CPSL Championship (1): 2003

Toronto Croatia
CSL Championship (2): 2007, 2011
Croatian World Club Championship (2): 2007, 2011

References

External links
 Profile at BDFA 

1979 births
Living people
Argentine footballers
Argentine expatriate footballers
Defensa y Justicia footballers
Provincial Osorno footballers
Toronto Croatia players
Expatriate footballers in Chile
Expatriate soccer players in Canada
Canadian Soccer League (1998–present) players
Brampton Stallions (Hitmen) players
Primera Nacional players
Primera B de Chile players
Association football forwards
Footballers from Buenos Aires